Sarah Keys Evans (born Sarah Louise Keys; 1928 or 1929) is an African American Army veteran who was a major figure in the civil rights movement in the United States.

Biography 
A native of Washington, North Carolina, Keys is the daughter of David Keys, a Navy veteran of World War I and a convert to Catholicism. Keys enlisted in the Women's Army Corps in 1951. She completed her training at Fort McClellan, Alabama, and was stationed at Fort Dix in New Jersey.

As a Private First Class on 1 August 1952, Keys traveled from Fort Dix to her family's home in North Carolina. When the bus stopped to change drivers, the new bus driver demanded that Keys relinquish her seat to a white Marine. Keys, feeling tired, declined. She was arrested and spent 13 hours alone in a jail cell in Roanoke Rapids, North Carolina. She was then ordered to pay a $25 fine for disorderly conduct.

Keys was represented by attorney Dovey Johnson Roundtree in Keys v. Carolina Coach Co. During that time, Keys had been assigned to Fort Knox, Kentucky. and was discharged in 1953. The case was finally resolved in Keys' favor in 1955 by the Interstate Commerce Commission. Keys was working at a beauty salon in Brooklyn when the news broke. She had tried to keep her case a secret, but her photo soon appeared in the newspapers. Later that same year, Rosa Parks was arrested for refusing to yield her seat to a white passenger.

Personal life 
In 1958, Sarah Keys married George Evans.

Legacy 
Keys was invited to speak at the 1997 Dedication of the Women in Military Service for America Memorial. In 2020, Roanoke Rapids declared 1 August to be "Sarah Keys Evans Day," and dedicated a mural depicting her story.

The 117th United States Congress considered a bill awarding Keys with the Congressional Gold Medal.

Personal life 
Keys is a member of Our Lady of Victory Catholic Church in Brooklyn, New York.

References

African-American activists
African-American female military personnel
Military personnel from North Carolina
People from Washington, North Carolina
Living people
Year of birth uncertain
1920s births
African-American history of North Carolina
Women's Army Corps soldiers
20th-century African-American women
20th-century African-American people
21st-century African-American people
21st-century African-American women
African-American United States Army personnel
African-American Catholics